Clarke City, called Paushtiku in the Innu language, is a community in the City of Sept-Îles, in the Quebec region of Côte-Nord. It is located roughly 20 kilometers west of the Sept-Îles city centre, on the Sainte-Marguerite River near Route 138. The name of the town originated from the Clarke brothers who established a paper mill there in 1903 to feed their publication house in Toronto. They also built a hydroelectric factory in 1908 and that year, the village was officially founded as the region's first closed city. Also that year, the registers of the Saint-Cœur-de-Marie Parish began, counting some 400 persons in Clarke City.

The city was amalgamated into the city of Sept-Îles in 1970  and it is now a sector in the western part of Sept-Îles.

References

Neighbourhoods in Sept-Îles, Quebec
Former municipalities in Quebec
Populated places disestablished in 1970